{{DISPLAYTITLE:C24H32O8}}
The molecular formula C24H32O8 may refer to:

 Estradiol glucuronides
 Estradiol 3-glucuronide
 Estradiol 17β-glucuronide
 Salvinorin B ethoxymethyl ether